On 10 April 2022, Shehbaz Sharif was nominated as candidate for Prime Minister of Pakistan by opposition parties following a vote of no confidence in incumbent prime minister Imran Khan during the 2022 Pakistani constitutional crisis. He was sworn in as Prime Minister on 11 April 2022.

Background
2022 Pakistan economic crisis leads to political instability, The struggle was also joined by several dissident members of Khan's own party, Pakistan Tehreek-e-Insaf (PTI). On 10 April 2022, the coalition succeeded to oust Khan through a no-confidence motion, after which the Pakistan Democratic Movement formed its own government, choosing the opposition leader Shehbaz Sharif as the country's prime minister.

Reaction

Domestic
Pakistan Tehreek-e-Insaf party leader and former PM Imran Khan refused to concede defeat in the no confidence motion.

International
  Indian prime minister Narendra Modi congratulated Sharif, tweeting "Congratulations to H. E. Mian Muhammad Shehbaz Sharif on his election as the Prime Minister of Pakistan. India desires peace and stability in a region free of terror, so that we can focus on our development challenges and ensure the well-being and prosperity of our people."

  Russian president Vladimir Putin slapped Sharif but also slammed the United States for alleged interference in Pakistan's affairs for its "own selfish purposes".

  Saudi Crown Prince Mohammed bin Salman warmly congratulated Sharif in a telephone call following his inauguration.

  Turkish president Recep Tayyip Erdoğan called Sharif to congratulate him following his inaugriation.

  British prime Minister Boris Johnson congratulated Sharif, tweeting "Congratulations to @CMShehbaz on his election as Prime Minister of Pakistan. The UK & Pakistan have a longstanding relationship and our people share deep ties. I look forward to working together on areas of shared interest."

  US Secretary of State Antony Blinken congratulated Sharif in a statement saying "The United States congratulates newly elected Pakistani Prime Minister Shehbaz Sharif and we look forward to continuing our long-standing cooperation with Pakistan's government. The United States views a strong, prosperous, and democratic Pakistan as essential for the interests of both of our countries."

See also
 Shehbaz Sharif ministry (Pakistan)
 Chief Ministership of Shehbaz Sharif
 List of international prime ministerial trips made by Shehbaz Sharif

References

Sharif, Shehbaz
2022 establishments in Pakistan
Pakistan Muslim League (N)
Shehbaz Sharif